"Run Rudolph Run" is a Christmas song written by Chuck Berry but credited to Johnny Marks and M. Brodie due to Marks' trademark on the character of Rudolph the Red-Nosed Reindeer. It was published by St. Nicholas Music (ASCAP) and was first recorded by Berry in 1958, released as a single on Chess Records.

It has since been covered by numerous other artists, sometimes with the title "Run Run Rudolph". The song is a 12-bar blues, musically similar to Berry's very popular and recognizable song "Johnny B. Goode", and melodically similar to his song "Little Queenie", the latter of which was released shortly after, in 1959.

History
Chuck Berry reported that he wrote the song himself, but then discovered that the name Rudolph was trademarked by Johnny Marks.  Marks sued and consequently was given songwriting credit although he "had nothing to do with the song."  Berry also said that M. Brodie does not exist, but was a pseudonym created as "a scheme to make more money for Marks and his publisher."  Berry's 1958 45-rpm single gives writing credits to "C. Berry Music – M. Brodie". All subsequent cover versions of the song are credited to Marks and Brodie, as published by Marks's St. Nicholas Music (ASCAP).

The song's dialogue between Santa and the children references popular toys of the 1950s:

Cover versions

This song was covered by singer Whitney Wolanin in 2013. Her recording reached the highest chart position of all versions on Billboard, reaching number two on its Adult Contemporary chart. Wolanin starred in a parody music film with the song about the original film A Christmas Story at the Christmas Story House.

It has been covered by other artists including Straight No Chaser, the Ethical Debating Society, Slaughter & the Dogs, L.A. Guns, Mojo Nixon, Emily Osment, Lynyrd Skynyrd, Southern Pacific, Sister Hazel, Billy Ray Cyrus, Foo Fighters, Five Easy Pieces, Jo Jo Zep & the Falcons, Dave Edmunds, Hanson, Sheryl Crow, Bryan Adams, Lulu, Click Five, the Grateful Dead, Keith Richards (on his first solo single), Brinsley Schwarz, Jimmy Buffett, Foghat, Paul Brandt, Whitney Wolanin, Kelly Clarkson, the Tractors, Dwight Yoakam, Reverend Horton Heat, Hanoi Rocks, Billy Idol, Cee Lo Green, Luke Bryan, Brian Setzer Orchestra, Joe Perry, Los Lonely Boys, Jane Krakowski, the cast of the Broadway musical Million Dollar Quartet, the Yobs, Vincent Martella (as the character Phineas Flynn, from Phineas and Ferb), the Muppets' band Dr. Teeth and the Electric Mayhem, and a one-off supergroup consisting of Lemmy Kilmister, Billy Gibbons, and Dave Grohl for the 2008 album We Wish You a Metal Xmas and a Headbanging New Year. It was also covered by Aerosmith guitarist Joe Perry for his 2014 EP Joe Perry's Merry Christmas by and Sara Evans on her 2014 album Sara Evans: At Christmas. Cheap Trick released it on their Christmas Christmas CD release in 2017.

Conan O'Brien and his house band, Jimmy Vivino and the Basic Cable Band, played the song to close a show in December 2010.

Chart performance
Berry's 1958 recording peaked at number 69 on the Billboard Hot 100 chart in December 1958 during its initial chart run. Sixty years later, the single re-entered the Hot 100 chart at number 45 (on the week ending January 5, 2019), reaching an overall peak position of number 10 on the week ending January 2, 2021, following its third chart re-entry, becoming Berry's third top-ten hit and his first since 1972's "My Ding-a-Ling". In doing so, it broke the record for the longest climb to the top 10 since its first entry in December 1958, at 62 years and two weeks.

Berry's original version first made the UK Singles Chart on the week ending Christmas Day 1963, peaking at number 36 two weeks later (with the song's title misspelled as "Run Rudolf Run").

In 2013 Whitney Wolanin released a version of the song that reached number two on the Billboard Adult Contemporary chart. The only other recordings that charted in the U.S. were by the country music artists Luke Bryan, whose 2008 rendition peaked at number 42 on the Hot Country Songs chart, and Justin Moore, whose 2011 version peaked at number 58 on the Hot Country Songs chart.

Chuck Berry

Whitney Wolanin

Luke Bryan

Justin Moore

Certifications

Notes

References

External links
[ Allmusic Entry]

1958 songs
1958 singles
American Christmas songs
Chess Records singles
Christmas novelty songs
Chuck Berry songs
Jo Jo Zep & The Falcons songs
Luke Bryan songs
Justin Moore songs
Songs about mammals
Songs about fictional male characters
Songs about Santa Claus
Songs written by Johnny Marks